The Byzantine Empire experienced several cycles of growth and decay over the course of nearly a thousand years, including major losses during the Early Muslim conquests of the 7th century. However, modern historians generally agree that the start of the empire's final decline began in the 11th century.

In the 11th century the empire experienced a major catastrophe in which most of its heartland territory in Anatolia was lost to the Seljuk Turks following the Battle of Manzikert and ensuing civil war. At the same time, the empire lost its last territory in Italy to the Norman Kingdom of Sicily and faced repeated attacks on its territory in the Balkans. These events created the context for emperor Alexios I Komnenos to call to the West for help, which led to the First Crusade. However, economic concessions to the Italian republics of Venice and Genoa weakened the empire's control over its own finances, especially from the 13th century onward, while tensions with the West led to the Sack of Constantinople by the forces of the Fourth Crusade in 1204 and the dismemberment of the empire. 

Although a number of small Byzantine successor states survived and eventually reclaimed Constantinople in 1261, the empire had been severely weakened. In the longer term, the rise of Turkish power in Anatolia eventually gave rise to the Ottoman Empire which rapidly conquered the former Byzantine heartland over the course of the 14th and 15th centuries, culminating in the Fall of Constantinople to the army of Sultan Mehmed the Conqueror in 1453.

Timeline of decline

The most significant events generally agreed by historians to have played a role in the decline of the Byzantine Empire are summarised below:

The Battle of Manzikert in 1071, which saw emperor Romanos IV Diogenes captured by the army of Seljuk Sultan Alp Arslan. The defeat led to a Byzantine civil war lasting ten years, in which eight different revolts took place. The damage was increased by the use of Turkish mercenaries by the various factions, which in some cases led to Turkish occupation of entire cities and regions. A notable example is the revolt of Nikephoros Melissenos in 1080, in which the towns he had occupied and garrisoned with Turkish soldiers in Ionia, Phrygia, Galatia, and Bithynia remained in their hands even after the revolt ended, including Nicaea, which for a time became the capital of the Seljuk Sultanate of Rum.

The Battle of Myriokephalon in 1176, in which an army led by emperor Manuel I Komnenos attempted to capture the Seljuk capital at Konya, but was ambushed in a narrow mountain pass and defeated by the army of Sultan Kilij Arslan II. The battle is generally considered significant both because it put an end to Byzantine plans to recover central Anatolia, and because of the psychological effect it had both on the emperor himself, and the empire's international reputation. In the years after Manuel's death in 1180, the Seljuks built on their victory by expanding their control at the expense of the Byzantines, while Manuel's teenage successor Alexios II was overthrown in a coup.   

The Sack of Constantinople in 1204 saw the weakened empire partitioned between the Republic of Venice and a Crusader army led by Boniface I, Marquess of Montferrat. A new Latin Empire was established, led by Baldwin I, Latin Emperor. Although Byzantine successor states emerged in Nicaea, Trebizond and Epirus, and went on to reclaim the capital in 1261, many historians cite the loss of the capital as a fatal blow to the Byzantine Empire. 

The Byzantine civil wars of the 14th century, including the Byzantine civil war of 1321–1328 and the Byzantine civil war of 1341–1347, which completely destroyed what little strength the empire had left. 

The Fall of Gallipoli in 1354 saw the Ottoman Turks cross into Europe, while the empire was powerless to stop them. This event has been seen by modern historians such as Donald M. Nicol to be the point of no return for the Byzantine Empire, after which its fall was virtually inevitable.

Causes of the decline

Civil wars

Probably the most important single cause of Byzantium's collapse was its recurrent debilitating civil wars. Three of the worst periods of civil war and internal infighting took place during Byzantium's decline. Each time, these civil wars coincided with a catastrophic reduction in Byzantine power and influence, which was never fully reversed before the next collapse. 

The period from 1071 to 1081 saw eight revolts:  

 1072: Uprising of Georgi Voiteh
 1073–1074: Revolt of Roussel de Bailleul proclaims Caesar John Doukas Emperor.
 1077–1078: Revolt and successful usurpation by Nikephoros III Botaneiates.
 1077–1078: Revolt of Nikephoros Bryennios the Elder against Michael VII Doukas and Nikephoros III, defeated at the Battle of Kalavrye.
 1078: Revolt of Philaretos Brachamios against Michael VII Doukas.
 1078: Revolt of Nikephoros Basilakes against Nikephoros III.
 1080–1081: Revolt of Nikephoros Melissenos against Nikephoros III.
 1081: Revolt and successful usurpation by Alexios I Komnenos.

This was followed by a period of secure dynastic rule by the Komnenos dynasty, under Alexios I (1081-1118), John II Komnenos (1118-43) and Manuel I Komnenos (1143-1180). Cumulatively, these three emperors were able to partially restore the empire's fortunes, but they never were able to fully undo the damage caused by the instability at the end of the 11th century, nor return the empire's frontiers to those of 1071. 

The second period of civil war and collapse took place after Manuel's death in 1180. Manuel's son Alexios II Komnenos was overthrown in 1183 by Andronikos I Komnenos, whose reign of terror destabilised the empire internally and led to his overthrow and death in Constantinople in 1185. The Angelos dynasty which ruled Byzantium from 1185 to 1204 has been considered one of the most unsuccessful and ineffectual administrations in the empire's history. During this period, Bulgaria and Serbia broke away from the empire, further land was lost to the Seljuk Turks. In 1203, the imprisoned former emperor Alexios IV Angelos escaped jail and fled to the west, where he promised the leaders of the Fourth Crusade generous payment if they would help him regain the throne. These promises later proved to be impossible to keep; in the event, the dynastic squabbling between the weak and ineffectual members of the Angelid dynasty brought about the Sack of Constantinople; Constantinople was burned, pillaged and destroyed, thousands of its citizens were killed, many of the surviving inhabitants fled, and much of the city became a depopulated ruin. The damage to Byzantium was incalculable; many historians point to this moment as a fatal blow in the empire's history. Although the empire was reformed in 1261 by the recapture of the city by forces from the Empire of Nicaea, the damage was never reversed and the empire never returned to anywhere near its former territorial extent, wealth and military power. 

The third period of civil war took place in the 14th century. Two separate periods of civil war, again making extensive use of Turkish, Serbian and even Catalan troops, often operating independently under their own commanders, and often raiding and destroying Byzantine lands in the process, ruined the domestic economy and left the state virtually powerless and overrun by its enemies. Conflicts between Andronikos II and Andronikos III, and then later between John VI Kantakouzenos and John V Palaiologos, marked the final ruin of Byzantium. The Byzantine civil war of 1321–1328 allowed the Turks to make notable gains in Anatolia and set up their capital in Bursa 100 kilometers from Constantinople the Byzantine's capital. The civil war of 1341–1347 saw exploitation of the Byzantine Empire by the Serbs, whose ruler took advantage of the chaos to proclaim himself emperor of the Serbs and Greeks. The Serbian king Stefan Uroš IV Dušan made significant territorial gains in Byzantine Macedonia in 1345 and conquered large swathes of Thessaly and Epirus in 1348. In order to secure his authority during the civil war, Kantakouzenos hired Turkish mercenaries. Although these mercenaries were of some use, in 1352 they seized Gallipoli from the Byzantines. By 1354, the empire's territory consisted of Constantinople and Thrace, the city of Thessaloniki, and some territory in the Morea.

Fall of the theme system

The disintegration of the Byzantine Empire's traditional military system, the 'theme' system, played a role in its decline. Under this arrangement, which was in its heyday from circa 650 to 1025, the empire was divided into several regions which contributed locally raised troops to the imperial armies. The system provided an effective means of cheaply mobilizing large numbers of men, and the result was a comparatively large and powerful force – the army of the theme of Thrakesion alone had provided about 9,600 men in the period 902–936, for example. But from the 11th century onwards, the theme system was allowed to decay. This played a major role in the loss of Anatolia to the Turks at the end of that century.

In the 12th century, the Komnenian dynasty re-established an effective military force. Manuel I Komnenos, for example, was able to muster an army of over 40,000 men. However, the theme system was never replaced by a viable long-term alternative, and the result was an empire that depended more than ever before on the strengths of each individual emperor or dynasty. The collapse of imperial power and authority after 1185 revealed the inadequacy of this approach. After the deposition of Andronikos I Komnenos in 1185, the dynasty of the Angeloi oversaw a period of military decline. From 1185 onwards, Byzantine emperors found it increasingly difficult to muster and pay for sufficient military forces, while the failure of their efforts to sustain their empire exposed the limitations of the entire Byzantine military system, dependent as it was on competent personal direction from the emperor. 

Despite the restoration under the Palaiologoi, Byzantium was never again a great power on the scale of the past. By the 13th century, the imperial army numbered a mere 6,000 men. As one of the main institutional strengths of the Byzantine state, the demise of the theme system left the empire lacking in underlying structural strengths.

Increasing reliance on mercenaries

As far back as the invasion of Africa by Belisarius, foreign soldiers were used in war. While foreign military intervention was not an all together new occurrence, the reliance on it, and its ability to damage political, social, and economic institutions were dramatically increased in the 11th, 13th, 14th, and 15th centuries. The 11th century saw increasing tensions between Courtly, and Military factions. Until the mid 11th century the empire had long been under the control of the Military Factions with leaders such as Basil II, and John I Tzimiskes, however the crisis of Basil II's succession led to increasing uncertainty in the future of politics. The army demanded Constantine VIII's daughters ascend to the throne by virtue of their relation to Basil II, leading to a number of marriages, and increasing power for the Courtly faction. This culminated after the failed Battle of Manzikert. As civil wars broke out, and tensions between courtly, and military factions reached a zenith, the demand for soldiers led to the hiring of Turkish mercenaries. These mercenaries aided in the Byzantine loss of Anatolia by drawing more Turkish soldiers into the interior of the empire, and by giving the Turks an increasing presence in Byzantine politics. These interventions also led to further destabilization of the political system.

Reliance on foreign military intervention, and sponsorship for political motives, continued even during the Komnenoi Restoration, Alexius I used Turkish mercenaries in the civil wars he participated in with Nikephoros III Botaneiates. In 1204, Alexios IV Angelos relied on Latin soldiers to claim the throne of Byzantium, leading to the sack of Constantinople, and the creation of the successor states.

Loss of control over revenue

Economic concessions to the Italian Republics of Venice and Genoa weakened the empire's control over its own finances, especially from the ascension of Michael VIII Palaiologos in the 13th century onward. At this time it was common for emperors to seek sponsorship from Venice, Genoa, and the Turks. This led to a series of disastrous trade deals with the Italian states; drying up one of the empire's final sources of revenue. This further led to competition between Venice, and Genoa to get emperors on the throne who supported their respective trade agenda to the detriment of the other, adding another level of instability to the Byzantine political process. 

By the time of the Byzantine–Genoese War (1348–49), only thirteen percent of custom dues passing through the Bosporus strait were going to the Empire. The remaining 87 percent was collected by the Genoese from their colony of Galata.  Genoa collected 200,000 hyperpyra from annual custom revenues from Galata, while Constantinople collected a mere 30,000. The loss of control over its own revenue sources drastically weakened the Byzantine empire, hastening its decline. At the same time, the system of Pronoia (land grants in exchange for military service), became increasingly corrupt and dysfunctional by the later empire, and by the 14th century many of the empire's nobles were not paying any tax, nor were they serving in the empire's armies. This further undermined the financial basis of the state, and placed further reliance on unreliable mercenaries, which only hasted the empire's demise.

The failed Union of the Churches

Emperor Michael VIII Palaiologos signed a union with the Catholic church in the 13th century in the hope of staving off western attack, but the policy was unsuccessful. The empire's western enemies soon resumed attacking the empire, while the social divisions the deeply unpopular union created inside the empire were damaging to Byzantine society. The controversy over church union failed to provide the empire with any lasting benefit, while the prisons were soon full of dissenters and Orthodox clergy. This undermined the legitimacy of the Palaiologos dynasty and further facilitated social divisions, which were ultimately to play a role in the loss of Anatolia to the Ottoman Turks.

Byzantine envoys presented themselves at the Second Council of Lyons 24 June 1274. On the fourth session of the Council the formal act of union was performed, however with Pope Gregory's death (January, 1276), the hoped for gains did not materialise.

While the union was opposed at all levels of society, it was especially opposed by the greater populace, led by the monks and the adherents of the deposed Patriarch Arsenios, known as the Arsenites. One of the chief anti-unionist leaders was Michael's own sister Eulogia (aka Irene), who fled to the court of her daughter Maria Palaiologina Kantakouzene, Tsarina of the Bulgars, from where she intrigued unsuccessfully against Michael. More serious was the opposition of the sons of Michael of Epirus, Nikephoros I Komnenos Doukas and his half-brother John the Bastard: they posed as the defenders of Orthodoxy and gave support to the anti-unionists fleeing Constantinople. Michael at first responded with comparative leniency, hoping to win the anti-unionists through persuasion, but eventually the virulence of the protests led him to resort to force. Many anti-unionists were blinded or exiled. Two prominent monks, Meletios and Ignatios, were punished: the first had his tongue cut out, the second was blinded. Even imperial officials were harshly treated, and the death penalty was decreed even for simply reading or possessing pamphlets directed against the Emperor. "From the intensity of these disorders, tantamount almost to civil wars," concludes Geanakoplos, "it might appear that too great a price had been paid for the sake of union."

The religious situation only worsened for Michael. The Arsenite party found widespread support amongst the discontented in the Anatolian provinces, and Michael responded there with similar viciousness: according to Vryonis, "These elements were either removed from the armies or else, alienated, they deserted to the Turks". Another attempt to clear the encroaching Turkmen from the Meaender valley in 1278 found limited success, but Antioch on the Maeander was irretrievably lost as were Tralles and Nyssa four years later.

On 1 May 1277, John the Bastard convoked a synod at Neopatras that anathematized the Emperor, Patriarch, and Pope as heretics. In response, a synod was convoked at the Hagia Sophia on 16 July where both Nikephoros and John were anathematized in return. John called a final synod at Neopatras in December 1277, where an anti-unionist council of eight bishops, a few abbots, and one hundred monks, again anathematized the Emperor, Patriarch, and Pope.

Conflict with Crusaders and Turks

Crusaders
Though the Crusades assisted Byzantium in driving back some of the Turks, they went far beyond the military assistance envisaged by  Alexios I.
Instead of following the strategic necessities of the war against the Turks, the Crusaders were focussed on the quest of re-conquering Jerusalem, 
and instead of returning territory to Byzantium, the Crusaders established their own principalities, becoming a territorial rival to Byzantine interests in their own right.

This was true already during  the Third Crusade, which induced emperor Isaac II Angelos to make a secret alliance with Saladin to impede the progress of Frederick Barbarossa, but open conflict between Crusaders and Byzantium erupted in the Fourth Crusade, resulting in the Sack of Constantinople in 1204. Constantinople was now itself a Crusader state, known as the Latin Empire in historiography, but from the Greek perspective as Frankokratia or "rule of the Franks". Vestiges of imperial power were preserved in minor principalities,   the Nicaean Empire, Trebizond and Epirus. Much of the Nicaean Emperors' efforts now went into combating the Latins, and even after Constantinople was returned to Greek rule  under the Palaiologoi in 1261, the Empire exerted much of its efforts into defeating its Latin neighbours, contributing to the eventual failure of the Crusades by 1291.

Rise of the Seljuks and Ottomans

No emperor after the Komnenian period was in a position to expel the Turks from Asia Minor, while the preoccupation of the Nicaean emperors with the attempt to recover Constantinople meant that resources were diverted away from Asia Minor and towards the west. The result was a weakening of the Byzantine defenses in the region, which, when combined with insufficient resources and incompetent leadership, led to the complete loss of all the empire's Asian territory to the Turks by 1338.

The disintegration of the Seljuk Turks led to the rise of the Ottoman Turks. Their first important leader was Osman I Bey, who attracted Ghazi warriors and carved out a domain in north-western Asia Minor. Attempts by the Byzantine Emperors to drive back the Ottomans were unsuccessful, and ceased in 1329 with the Battle of Pelekanon. Following a number of civil disputes in the Byzantine Empire, the Ottomans subjugated the Byzantines as vassals in the late 14th century and attempts to relieve this vassal status culminated in the Fall of Constantinople in 1453.

Devastation of Anatolia
Apostolos Vakalopoulos Describes the Devastation the seljuk raids had on Anatolia:

Quoting contemporary authorities, J. Laurent writes: “It is difficult even to imagine the complete ruin the Turks left behind them. Whatever they could reach, men or crops, nothing remained alive; and a week was sufficient under dread of famine to force them to abandon the most prosperous areas. On their departure all that was left were devastated fields, trees cut down, mutilated corpses and towns driven mad by fear or in flames.’”’ At Armorium, it is said, 100,000 people perished, and at Touch 120,000 were massacred and 150,000 sold into slavery—thus the destruction went on. Whole districts were depopulated. ‘When the Turks had passed by, such as were left alive feared to return...trusting in neither the walls of their cities, nor the crags of the mountains, they crowded into Constantinople where they were decimated by plague. In a few years Cappadocia, Phrygia, Bithynia, and Paphlagonia lost the greater part of their Greek population.” J. Laurent writes further:“In brief, the population of Asia Minor vanished before the Turks. The people fled far away, or shut themselves up in their Cities, or sought refuge in the mountains which border the central plateau of the peninsula. The valleys and the plains which stretch from Caesarea and Sebaste to Nicaea and Sardes remained all but empty. And as they fell fallow, the Turks with their tents and their flocks wandered over them contentedly, as they had done in the deserts out of which they had come"

Demetrios Cydones on the Turkish depredations in Anatolia:

According to Speros Vryonis:

Byzantine princess Anna Komnene says:

A Letter written by Manuel II Palaiologos in 1391 to Demetrios Kydones makes specific reference to the Turkish threat to the Byzantine Empire, noting how the Greek Christian inhabitants of Anatolia "have fled to the clefts in the rocks, to the forests, and to the mountain heights in an effort to escape a death from which there is no escape, a very cruel and inhuman death without any semblance of justice…. Nobody is spared, neither very young children nor defenseless women. For those whom old age or illness prevents from running away there is no hope of escaping the murderous blade."

See also

Byzantine Dark Ages in the 7th–8th centuries
Byzantine-Lombard Wars
Byzantine–Seljuq wars
Byzantine Empire under the Doukas dynasty
Byzantine Empire under the Angelos dynasty
Byzantine Empire under the Palaiologos dynasty
List of Byzantine revolts and civil wars

Notes

Bibliography

Alan Harvey, "Economic expansion in the Byzantine empire, 900–1200"
John Haldon, "The Byzantine Wars"
J.W. Birkenmeier, The Development of the Komnenian Army 1081–1180
Magdalino, Paul, The empire of Manuel I Komnenos 1143–1180

Runciman, Steven. The Fall of Constantinople 1453. Cambridge: Cambridge University Press, 1965.
Vryonis, Speros. The Decline of Medieval Hellenism in Asia Minor and the Process of Islamization from the Eleventh through the Fifteenth Century. Berkeley: University of California Press, 1971.

External links

Military history of the Byzantine Empire
Crusades
Komnenos dynasty
11th century in the Byzantine Empire
12th century in the Byzantine Empire
13th century in the Byzantine Empire
14th century in the Byzantine Empire
15th century in the Byzantine Empire

Byzantine Empire